The 312th Military Intelligence Battalion Formerly known as 23rd Signal Construction Battalion, 23rd Signal Heavy Construction Battalion, 312th Communications Reconnaissance Battalion, 312th Army Security Agency Battalion, is an active duty Military Intelligence Battalion of the United States Army. The 312th Military Intelligence Battalion is stationed at Fort Sam Houston, Texas where it conducts all-source, counterintelligence and human intelligence operations in support of US Army South and United States Southern Command requirements.

See also 
 470th Military Intelligence Brigade

References 

Military Intelligence battalions of the United States Army